Anthony Cruz (born 1 October 1956) is a Malaysian field hockey player. He competed in the men's tournament at the 1976 Summer Olympics.

References

External links
 

1956 births
Living people
Malaysian male field hockey players
Olympic field hockey players of Malaysia
Field hockey players at the 1976 Summer Olympics
Place of birth missing (living people)